Oklahoma County is located in the central part of the U.S. state of Oklahoma. As of the 2010 census, the population was 718,633, making it the most populous county in Oklahoma. The county seat is Oklahoma City, the state capital and largest city.

Oklahoma County is at the heart of the Oklahoma City Metropolitan Statistical Area.

Oklahoma County is one of seven counties in the United States to share the same name as the state it is located in (the other six being Arkansas County, Hawaii County, Idaho County, Iowa County, New York County (Manhattan), and Utah County), and the only one of the seven to contain the state capital, and one of two to contain a city of the same name as well.

History

The area that would someday be called Oklahoma County was originally inhabited by members of the indigenous nations of the Southern Plains, but by the 1830s the land would become part of the territory assigned to the Seminoles and Creeks after their removal from their ancestral lands in the Southeastern USA.

As a result of the Reconstruction era treaties signed between the US government and the Seminole and Creek nations in 1866, the land was taken from tribal jurisdiction but not assigned to other tribal governments, which in time led it to be called the Unassigned Lands. In 1889, the US federal government held a land run for the Unassigned lands, which led to the rapid settlement of the area.

By 1890, Oklahoma County was called "County Two" and was one of seven counties established by the Organic Act of 1890.

County business initially took place in a building at the intersection of California Avenue and Robinson Street until the construction of the first Oklahoma County Courthouse at 520 West Main Street in the 1900s. In 1937, the county government was moved to a building at 321 Park Avenue, which now serves only as the county courthouse.

Geography

Major highways

Adjacent counties

 Logan County (north)
 Lincoln County (east)
 Pottawatomie County (southeast)
 Cleveland County (south)
 Canadian County (west)
 Kingfisher County (northwest)

National protected area
 Oklahoma City National Memorial

Demographics

As of the Census of 2010, there were 718,633 people, 277,615 households, and 172,572 families residing in the county.  The population density was 1,013 people per square mile (391/km2).  There were 319,828 housing units at an average density of 416 per square mile (161/km2).  The racial makeup of the county was 64.6% White, 15.4% Black or African American, 3.5% Native American, 3% Asian, 0.1% Pacific Islander, 8.1% from other races, and 5.3% from two or more races.  15.1% of the population were Hispanic or Latino of any race. 12.4% were of German, 12.3% Mexican, 10.1% Irish, 7.9% English, and 7.7% American ancestries according to the Census 2010. 84.4% spoke English and 11.5% Spanish as their first language.

There were 277,615 households, out of which 28.5% had children under the age of 18 living with them, 43.1% were married couples living together, 15.4% had a female householder with no husband present, and 37.8% were non-families. 31.9% of all households were made up of individuals, and 9.7% had someone living alone who was 65 years of age or older.  The average household size was 2.56 and the average family size was 3.26.

In the county, the population was spread out, with 25.60% under the age of 18, 10.90% from 18 to 24, 30.00% from 25 to 44, 21.40% from 45 to 64, and 12.20% who were 65 years of age or older.  The median age was 34 years. For every 100 females, there were 94.20 males.  For every 100 females age 18 and over, there were 90.80 males.

The median income for a household in the county was $42,916, and the median income for a family was $54,721. The per capita income for the county was $25,723.  About 11.70% of families and 15.30% of the population were below the poverty line, including 21.70% of those under age 18 and 8.60% of those age 65 or over.

Politics
Since the second half of the 20th century, Oklahoma County has been quite conservative for an urban county. It swung from a 20-point victory for Harry Truman in 1948 to a 15-point victory for Dwight Eisenhower in 1952. It has gone Republican in all but one presidential election since then; it narrowly voted for Lyndon Johnson in 1964. This mirrors the growing Republican trend in Oklahoma since the end of World War II. It was one of the few areas in the South where Jimmy Carter didn’t do well.

However, the Republican share of votes for President has decreased in every election since the 2004 election. In the 2018 Oklahoma gubernatorial election, Oklahoma County gave Democratic candidate Drew Edmondson the largest vote share of any county, with 54.2% of the vote, whereas Republican Mary Fallin won the county with 51.3% of the vote four years prior. Also, in the 2018 United States House of Representatives elections in Oklahoma, Democrat Kendra Horn received 52.3% of the vote in Oklahoma County, which was the only county in the state to vote for a Democratic House candidate. In the 2020 United States Presidential election, Republican Donald Trump narrowly carried the county (1% margin), down from 10 points in 2016. It was also the best showing for a Democrat in the county since LBJ.

County commissioners

County offices

Oklahoma House of Representatives

Oklahoma Senate

Congressional

Party registration

Communities

Cities

 Bethany
 Choctaw
 Del City
 Edmond
 Harrah
 Midwest City
 Nichols Hills
 Nicoma Park
 Oklahoma City (county seat)
 Spencer
 The Village
 Warr Acres

Towns

 Arcadia
 Forest Park
 Jones
 Lake Aluma
 Luther
 Smith Village
 Valley Brook
 Woodlawn Park

Unincorporated communities
 Four Counties Corner (formerly Lockridge)
 Newalla

Education
School districts include:

K-12:
 Bethany Public Schools
 Choctaw/Nicoma Park Schools
 Crooked Oak Public Schools
 Deer Creek Public Schools
 Edmond Public Schools
 Harrah Public Schools
 Jones Public Schools
 Luther Public Schools
 McLoud Public Schools
 Midwest City-Del City Schools
 Millwood Public Schools
 Moore Public Schools
 Mustang Public Schools
 Oklahoma City Public Schools
 Piedmont Public Schools
 Putnam City Public Schools
 Western Heights Public Schools

Elementary only: 
 Crutcho Public School
 Oakdale Public School

See also
 List of counties in Oklahoma
 National Register of Historic Places listings in Oklahoma County, Oklahoma

References

External links

 Oklahoma County Government's website
 Oklahoma Digital Maps: Digital Collections of Oklahoma and Indian Territory

 
Oklahoma City metropolitan area
1890 establishments in Oklahoma Territory
Populated places established in 1890